Christodoulos is a Greek given name. It is a theophoric name which means "servant of Christ". It can refer to:

 Christodoulos (Greek patriarch of Alexandria), r. 907–932
 Pope Christodoulos of Alexandria, Coptic patriarch in 1047–1077
 Christodulus (died 1131), the first emir of Palermo (later )
 Christodoulos Aronis, a Greek fine artist, professor and priest (1884–1973)
 Archbishop Christodoulos of Athens (1939–2008)
 Christodoulos Christodoulou (born 1939), a Cypriot economist, lawyer and a politician
 Christodoulos Moisa (born 1948), a New Zealand poet, artist, photographer, writer, essayist and art teacher
 Christodoulos Neophytou (born 1950), a Cypriot economist
 Christodoulos Christodoulides (born 1976), a Cypriot judoka who won the silver medal at the 2002 Commonwealth Games

See also 
 Christodoulou - Greek surname that means "son of Christodoulos"

Greek masculine given names